The Masonic Lodge in Stewartville, Minnesota, United States, is a building from 1868. It was listed on the National Register of Historic Places in 1980.

References

Buildings and structures in Olmsted County, Minnesota
Clubhouses on the National Register of Historic Places in Minnesota
Masonic buildings completed in 1868
Masonic buildings in Minnesota
National Register of Historic Places in Olmsted County, Minnesota